"Blood, Tears & Gold" is a song by the British duo Hurts from their first album, Happiness. The song was co-written with David Sneddon and The Nexus and was released as the fourth single from the album in Germany.

Music video
This is the second video which was shot by Hurts and published on YouTube at the beginning of 2010.

Track listing
German CD single
"Blood, Tears & Gold" – 4:18
"Blood, Tears & Gold" (Lotus Eaters On My Mind remix by Pantha du Prince) – 11:00

German digital download
"Blood, Tears & Gold" – 4:18
"Blood, Tears & Gold" (Lotus Eaters On My Mind remix by Pantha du Prince) (ECHO Kritikerpreis Gewinner 2011)
"Blood, Tears & Gold" (Moonbootica remix) – 5:44
"Sunday" (Paul van Dyk remix)
"Blood, Tears & Gold" VIDEO

Personnel
Songwriting – Hurts, David Sneddon, James Bauer-Mein

Source:

Charts

References

External links

2011 singles
Hurts songs
Synth-pop ballads
Rock ballads
2010 songs
Columbia Records singles
Songs written by David Sneddon